Kalkalpen National Park  (in English literally Limestone Alps National Park) is a national park within the Northern Limestone Alps mountain range, located in the state of Upper Austria, Austria. The park was established in 1997. The ancient beech forests within the national park were added to the UNESCO World Heritage Site known as Ancient and Primeval Beech Forests of the Carpathians and Other Regions of Europe, because of their undisturbed nature and testimony to the ecological history of Europe since the Last Glacial Period.

Description
The park contains Central Europe's largest forested area, as well the largest karst region in Austria.

Features
Kalkalpen National Park  has visitors centers in Molln, Ennstal, and at the Hengstpaßhütt near Rosenau.

It is accessible by a chair lift and hiking paths.

The park has numerous hiking, mountain biking, and horseback riding trails. The former Steyr Valley Railway, with sections now the Steyrtal rail trail, pass through the park in the Molln area. In the winter there are snowshoe hiking and alpine skiing routes.

The national park's lodge and seminar center is the 1907 Villa Sonnwend, located in Windischgarsten.

See also
Limestone Alps
List of national parks in the Alps
National parks of Austria
Ennstal Alps
Southern Limestone Alps

References

External links
—Official Nationalpark Kalkalpen (Limestone Alps National Park) website

National parks of Austria
Geography of Upper Austria
Northern Limestone Alps
1997 establishments in Austria
Protected areas established in 1997
Tourist attractions in Upper Austria
Protected areas of the Alps
Primeval Beech Forests in Europe
Ramsar sites in Austria